Globularia ascanii  is native to Gran Canaria island of the Canary Islands archipelago.

It is very rare and found on the Tamadaba Massif, in cliffs of the pine forest zone in Barranco Oscuro (~1200 m).

It is a small procumbent shrublet resembling G. sarcophylla but with larger broadly lanceolate leaves (5–10 cm), short peduncles (1–2 cm) and pale blue white flowers.

References

Bramwell, D. and Z. Bramwell. Wild Flowers of the Canary Islands. Editorial Rueda, Madrid, España. 2001.

External links
 Iucnredlist.org: Globularia ascanii
 Arkive.org: Globularia ascanii
  Magrama.gob.es: Globularia ascanii
  Pantasdemitierra.blogspot: Globularia ascanii
  Kew.org

ascanii
Endemic flora of the Canary Islands